Frans Roelf Petrus van Wyk (born 25 April 1995 in Delareyville, South Africa) is a South African rugby union player for the  in Super Rugby, the  in the Currie Cup and the  in the Rugby Challenge. He regularly plays as a prop.

Career

He moved to Gauteng and went to Monument High School in Krugersdorp, which meant he would represent the  provincially. He appeared for them at the 2011 Under-16 Grant Khomo week, as well as at the premier South African high school rugby competition, the Under-18 Craven Week, in both 2012 and 2013.

After high school, he made the move to Cape Town to join the Western Province Rugby Institute. He was included in the  side that participated in the 2014 Under-19 Provincial Championship and started the season in fine form, scoring two tries in their opening match of the season against  in a 50–26 victory. He made a total of nine appearances in both the loosehead and tighthead prop position as they went all the way in the competition, beating the  33–26 in the final in Cape Town to be crowned the 2014 champions.

He was named in a 37-man training squad for the South Africa national under-20 rugby union team and featured for them in a friendly match against a Varsity Cup Dream Team in April 2015. He was also included in the squad that embarked on a two-match tour of Argentina. He came on as a replacement in their 25–22 victory over Argentina, but did not feature in their 39–28 victory a few days later.

Upon the team's return, he was named in the final squad for the 2015 World Rugby Under 20 Championship. He played off the bench in all three of their matches in Pool B of the competition; a 33–5 win against hosts Italy which saw Van Wyk score South Africa's final try of the match in the 78th minute, a 40–8 win against Samoa and a 46–13 win over Australia to help South Africa finish top of Pool B to qualify for the semi-finals with the best record pool stage of all the teams in the competition. Van Wyk also came on as a replacement in their semi-final match against England, but could not prevent them losing 20–28 to be eliminated from the competition by England for the second year in succession, as well as in their third-place play-off match against France, where he helped South Africa to a 31–18 win to secure third place in the competition.

References

1995 births
Alumni of Monument High School
Living people
People from Tswaing Local Municipality
South African rugby union players
Rugby union props
Western Province (rugby union) players
South Africa Under-20 international rugby union players
Stormers players
Bulls (rugby union) players
Blue Bulls players
Lions (United Rugby Championship) players
Golden Lions players
Oyonnax Rugby players
Rugby union players from North West (South African province)